Vernon Forbes may refer to:

Vernon A. Forbes (1883–1918), American attorney and politician
Jake Forbes (ice hockey) (born Vernor Vivian Forbes; 1897–1985), Canadian ice hockey player